Elisabetta Matsumoto is an American physicist whose scientific interests include the study of knitted fabrics' special mathematical and mechanical properties.

After earning her PhD Matsumoto accepted a post-doctoral fellowship at Harvard University's Wyss Institute for Biologically Inspired Engineering.

In 2019 Matsumoto received five years of funding to study the mathematics of knitting from the National Science Foundation.

In 2019 Matsumoto was recognized with a National Science Foundation CAREER Award, a distinction the Foundation gives to particularly promising scientists relatively early in their careers.

The New York Times profiled Matsumoto following her popular presentations at the 2019 meeting of the American Physical Society.

Combining her interests in mathematics and the mechanical properties of knitting she is one of 24 mathematicians and artists who make up the Mathemalchemy Team.

Education
Postdoctoral Fellow, Applied Mathematics, Harvard University
Postdoctoral Fellow, Princeton Center for Theoretical Science, Princeton University
PhD in Physics, University of Pennsylvania, 2011 
MS in Physics, University of Pennsylvania, 2007 
BA in Physics, University of Pennsylvania, 2007

References

External links
Geometry of Materials: Matsumoto Group Homepage

Living people
21st-century American physicists
21st-century American women scientists
American women physicists
Textile engineers
University of Pennsylvania alumni
Georgia Tech faculty
Year of birth missing (living people)